Miss Black America is the sixth solo studio album by German producer Alec Empire, originally released through his Digital Hardcore Recordings label as a part of its DHR Limited series of single pressing albums. Recorded throughout August 1998 in between sessions for Atari Teenage Riots 60 Second Wipeout, the album was produced in response to the political climate of Germany at the time.

The band Miss Black America took their name from this album.

Track listing

References

External links
 
 Miss Black America on Bandcamp
Official Digital Hardcore Recordings site

Alec Empire albums
1999 albums